Neumeier is a surname. Notable people with the surname include: 

Bob Neumeier (c. 1951 – 2021), American sportscaster
Dan Neumeier (born 1948), American baseball player
Edward Neumeier (born 1957), American screenwriter, producer and director
Jack Neumeier (1919–2004), American football coach and creator of the spread offense
John Neumeier (born 1939), American ballet dancer, choreographer, and director
Karl G. Neumeier (1889-1992), American lawyer and politician
Mani Neumeier (born 1940), German rock musician
Marty Neumeier (born 1947), American author
Shain Neumeier (born 1987), American attorney
Tom Neumeier (1921–1991), Dutch Olympic rower

See also
Newmeyer